The siege of Cassel (March 1761) was a failed attempt by Duke Ferdinand of Brunswick to capture French-held Kassel, the capital of Hesse-Kassel.  Brunswick lifted the siege after forces of the Duc de Broglie inflicted heavy casualties on his forces at the Battle of Grünberg, making continuation of the siege untenable.

References

The History of the Seven Years War in Germany

Cassel (1761)
Cassel (1761)
Cassel
Cassel
History of Kassel
1761 in Europe
1761 in the Holy Roman Empire
Cassel